Gould's sequence is an integer sequence named after Henry W. Gould  that counts how many odd numbers are in each row of Pascal's triangle. It consists only of powers of two, and begins:
1, 2, 2, 4, 2, 4, 4, 8, 2, 4, 4, 8, 4, 8, 8, 16, 2, 4, ... 
For instance, the sixth number in the sequence is 4, because there are four odd numbers in the sixth row of Pascal's triangle (the four bold numbers in the sequence 1, 5, 10, 10, 5, 1).

Additional interpretations

Gould's sequence also gives the number of live cells in the th generation of the Rule 90 cellular automaton starting from a single live cell.
It has a characteristic growing sawtooth shape that can be used to recognize physical processes that behave similarly to Rule 90.

Related sequences
The binary logarithms (exponents in the powers of two) of Gould's sequence themselves form an integer sequence,
0, 1, 1, 2, 1, 2, 2, 3, 1, 2, 2, 3, 2, 3, 3, 4, ... 
Equivalently, the th value in Gould's sequence is

Taking the sequence of exponents modulo two gives the Thue–Morse sequence.

The partial sums of Gould's sequence,
0, 1, 3, 5, 9, 11, 15, 19, 27, 29, 33, 37, 45, ... 
count all odd numbers in the first  rows of Pascal's triangle.

Recursive construction and self-similarity
The first  values in Gould's sequence may be constructed by recursively constructing the first  values, and then concatenating the doubles of the first  values. For instance, concatenating the first four values 1, 2, 2, 4 with their doubles 2, 4, 4, 8 produces the first eight values. Because of this doubling construction, the first occurrence of each power of two  in this sequence is at position .

Gould's sequence, the sequence of its exponents, and the Thue–Morse sequence are all self-similar: they have the property that the subsequence of values at even positions in the whole sequence equals the original sequence, a property they also share with some other sequences such as Stern's diatomic sequence. In Gould's sequence, the values at odd positions are double their predecessors, while in the sequence of exponents, the values at odd positions are one plus their predecessors.

History
The sequence is named after Henry W. Gould, who studied it in the early 1960s.

Proving that the numbers in Gould's sequence are powers of two was given as a problem in the 1956 William Lowell Putnam Mathematical Competition.

References

Integer sequences
Factorial and binomial topics
Fractals
Scaling symmetries